Donaghmore is a civil parish in County Down, Northern Ireland. It is situated mainly in the historic barony of Iveagh Upper, Upper Half, with two townlands in the barony of Iveagh Lower, Upper Half.

People
Loyalist Robin Jackson, nicknamed "The Jackal" (1948-1998), was born in Donaghmore and is buried in the St. Bartholomew Church of Ireland churchyard.

Settlements
The townland contains the following villages:
Lurganare

Townlands
Donaghmore civil parish contains the following townlands:

Annaghbane
Ardkeeragh
Aughintober
Aughnacaven
Ballyblaugh
Ballylough
Ballymacaratty Beg
Ballymacaratty More
Buskhill
Cargabane
Carrickrovaddy
Corgary
Derrycraw
Drumantine
Drummiller
Glebe
Killysavan
Knocknanarny
Lurganare
Maddydrumbrist
Moneymore
Ringbane
Ringclare
Ringolish
Tullymore
Tullymurry

See also
List of civil parishes of County Down

References